Jeans are denim trousers.

Jeans may also refer to:

Astronomy
 Jeans (lunar crater)
 Jeans (Martian crater)
 2763 Jeans, an asteroid

Media and entertainment
 Jeans (band), a popular Mexican girl group
 Jeans (film), a 1998 Indian Tamil film by S. Shankar starring Prashanth and Aishwarya Rai
 Jeans (soundtrack), the soundtrack from the film
 "The Jeans", an episode of the American television show The Middle

People
 Jeans (surname)
 Jeans Coops, Belgian bobsledder and 1939 two-man world champion

See also 
Blue Jeans (disambiguation)
Jean (disambiguation)